Auburn station may refer to:

 Auburn station (California), in Auburn, California
 Auburn station (SEPTA), a former station in Auburn, Pennsylvania
 Auburn station (Sound Transit), in Auburn, Washington
 Auburn Park station, a planned railroad station in Chicago
 Auburn railway station, Melbourne, in Victoria, Australia
 Auburn railway station, Sydney, in New South Wales, Australia